FAM123B is a human gene, also referred to as WTX.

It has been associated with Wilms tumor.

References